Riccardo Ghedin and Stéphane Robert defeated Arnaud Clément and Olivier Rochus 6–2, 5–7, [10–7] in the final.

Seeds
The top three seeds received a bye into the quarterfinals.

Draw

Draw

References
 Doubles Draw

Orange Open Guadeloupe - Doubles
2011 Doubles